Sanchai Ratiwatana and Sonchat Ratiwatana won in the final 6–3, 7–6(4), against Juan Pablo Brzezicki and Iván Miranda.

Seeds

Draw

Draw

External links
 Main Draw

Abierto Internacional de Salinas - Doubles
2009 Doubles